German submarine U-521 was a Type IXC U-boat of Nazi Germany's Kriegsmarine during World War II.

She was built by the Deutsche Werft yard at Finkenwerder, Hamburg with yard number 336. Commissioned in June 1942, she was commanded by Kapitänleutnant Klaus Bargsten.
 
The U-boat was assigned to the 4th U-boat Flotilla for training and the 2nd flotilla for operations.

U-521 was sunk on 2 June 1943 by the submarine chaser . The only survivor was Bargsten himself. This was the second boat under Bargsten's command, and the first that suffered heavy losses. The wreck of the submarine has never been found.

Design
German Type IXC submarines were slightly larger than the original Type IXBs. U-521 had a displacement of  when at the surface and  while submerged. She had two shafts and two  propellers.

U-521 was fitted with six  torpedo tubes (four fitted at the bow and two at the stern), 22 torpedoes, one  SK C/32 naval gun, 180 rounds, and a  SK C/30 as well as a  C/30 anti-aircraft gun. The boat had a complement of forty-eight.

Service history

First patrol
U-521 sailed from Hamburg on her first patrol on 6 October 1942. She followed the usual course, sailing up the coast of Norway and then west, through the "Rosengarten" into the Atlantic. When she was north of Scotland, U-521 was attacked by an aircraft. According to Bargsten, he was standing on the bridge when the aircraft suddenly appeared out of the clouds, flying very low. The aircraft was carrying a trailing antenna, which almost struck the boat. Bargsten thought at first that it was a new weapon. The bomb-bay doors were open, but the aircraft did not drop any bombs. U-521 submerged, and, after it had gained considerable depth, several bombs were heard to explode.

The first war cruise lasted over nine weeks and accounted for five merchant vessels and a corvette. Two ships were sunk from an eastbound convoy and two more from one that was westbound. The fifth ship was a freighter which had been crippled by an attack from another U-boat and had dropped out of her convoy. She was guarded by a corvette. U-521 approached this target at night on the surface. Due to the presence of the corvette, Bargsten was somewhat cautious, and after firing, immediately turned the boat in order to be able to fire again from his stern tube while escaping. The first torpedo passed astern of the merchantmen and hit the corvette which sank rapidly. The freighter was then easily disposed-of at close range.

U-521s first patrol ended on 8 December 1942. She put in at Lorient in occupied France, where she had been assigned to the 2nd U-boat Flotilla, commanded by Korvettenkapitän Viktor Schütze of the 1925 naval term. Schütze was greatly admired by Bargsten, he spoke of a four-hour interview that he (Bargsten) had had with the flotilla commander. Bargsten was given credit for having sunk 29,000 tons of shipping and one corvette.

U-521 remained in Lorient for about three weeks, taking on supplies and preparing for her next sortie.

Second patrol
U-521 sailed from Lorient on her second patrol on 7 January 1943. Her operational area was in the vicinity of the Azores. She attacked several convoys on this patrol in the company of other U-boats. One of these attacks took place about 25 February 1943 in company with  commanded by Oberleutnant Hans Johannsen (U-569 was sunk on 22 May 1943).

During the course of an attack on a Gibraltar-bound convoy, U-521 sank three ships. After firing at the last of the three, Bargsten noticed another U-boat on a collision course with his boat. These maneuvers attracted the attention of American destroyers escorting the convoy, and U-521 was severely depth charged. Although about 70 depth charges were dropped, Bargsten was rather scornful of this attack. He stated that he easily eluded his enemies without making use of the S.B.T. and he criticized the destroyers for a lack of tenacity. The U-boat sustained some damage, including a slightly bent propeller shaft.

In spite of the damage, U-521 was able to remain at sea and succeeded in sinking another merchantman and a corvette. The freighter, a liberty ship, was hove-to and was being guarded by a corvette when she was sighted by the U-boat. It was a bright moonlit night, and the corvette was patrolling the dark side of the freighter. Bargsten, realizing that the corvette expected an attack from the dark side, approached from the moonlit side, on the surface. While drawing near to his target, Bargsten turned to his executive officer and said; "I feel like a naked man walking through the streets of a city."

The executive officer fired five torpedoes. Four of them missed completely, the fifth hit the corvette just as she was coming forward of the target. A sixth torpedo was fired by the second watch officer and found its mark. Bargsten attributed the executive officer's poor marksmanship to the fact that he failed to take into account the slight roll of the boat when he was making his calculations.

When U-521 was almost ready to return to her base, she was met by a supply U-boat from which she transferred oil and provisions. Bargsten stated that other U-boats were present, including U-569.

U-521 returned to Lorient on 26 March 1943 after having been at sea for 79 days. Schütze had been replaced by Korvettenkapitän Ernst Kals of the 1924 naval term as commanding officer of the second U-boat Flotilla. Bargsten's interview with Kals was a brief one, he felt that Kals was much less understanding than Schütze. Bargsten was credited with sinking 39,000 tons of shipping and one corvette on this patrol.

U-521 entered dry dock in Lorient for repairs. Bargsten was given leave and went to his home in Bremen, where he remained until 28 April 1943. While in Bremen, he witnessed a daylight bombing raid by American B-17 Flying Fortresses. He said that about 20 of the American bombers were shot down.

Bargsten arrived back in Lorient on 29 April 1943. On 2 May, he was awarded the Knight's Cross of the Iron Cross. Korvettenkapitän Hans-Rudolf Rösing of the 1924 naval term made the presentation. Three days later, U-521 sailed on her last patrol.

Third and final patrol
U-521 sailed from Lorient at about 1300 German Summer Time, on 5 May 1943. Her operational area was designated as being off the U.S. coast in the neighborhood of Cape Hatteras. She reached this area about 30 May, and on the same day, sighted planes and two destroyers. However, the boat was not discovered.

The sound operator reported propeller noises, but a few minutes later he reported that the noises had faded out and that all was quiet. Bargsten was lying in his bunk reading a travel book, immersed in a chapter called "Middletown, U.S.A.", as the submarine chaser  gained a Q.C. (sonar) contact on U-521 and closed in for the attack.

Sinking
At about 1230hrs in position , while escorting Convoy NG-365, the submarine chaser USS PC-565 obtained her first contact on U-521. She altered course, maintained contact, and at 1239hrs dropped a standard five-charge pattern set for 100 feet.

Meanwhile, Bargsten was peacefully reading in his bunk when the sound operator rushed in to report propeller noises directly overhead. Immediately thereafter, the depth charges exploded. Instruments were shattered, the lights went out, the motors stopped, rudder and diving planes were rendered useless, and water entered the control room through the depth and tank pressure gauge connections.

Bargsten at once gave the order to dive, although he did not know the extent of the damage received. Bargsten told him that that was "nonsense", but the engineer insisted and called off further readings from the control room depth gauge: "160 metres; 170 metres". The accuracy of the depth charges was devastating. Inside U-521, all instruments were shattered, all breakers blown and the diving planes and rudder were also disabled. Cold seawater was coming down the main hatch. Bargsten gave the order to dive for cover. After a few seconds, Oberleutnant (Ing.) Henning reported that they were sinking. Even though it did not make sense to Bargsten that the U-boat could plummet so quickly, he gave the order to blow all ballast. Bargsten subsequently realised that the U-boat could not have descended to the depths called off by the engineer officer without becoming heavy by the bow or the stern, whereas she had kept an even keel throughout. The main depth gauge must have been knocked out by the depth charges. Upon breaking the surface, Bargsten went to the bridge to make a topside assessment of the situation.

PC-565 was about  distant when the U-boat appeared. The patrol craft fired about 55 rounds with her 20 mm gun, scoring several hits on the conning tower. The gun jammed as the ship was turning to ram her target. She ceased firing then, as PC-565 was in the line of fire.

When Bargsten observed the maneuvers of PC-565 and saw the patrol craft bearing down on him, he realized the U-boat's position was hopeless and gave the order to flood and abandon ship. It was not until he saw his engineer officer coming through the conning tower hatchway, that Bargsten realised the former had become panicky, since the engineer's station was in the control room. His last view of his boat was of water pouring down the conning tower hatch as she went under. U-521 then suddenly sank, leaving Bargsten swimming in the water. The rest of the crew – 50 men – went down with the ship.

When the U-boat disappeared, PC-565 altered course to the right to pass ahead of the swirl. At 1243hrs, she dropped one depth charge set at  about  ahead of the position of the sinking. She then moved in to pick up the only survivor, and several large air slugs were observed. The patrol craft continued to search the area, and at 1325hrs several oil slicks were sighted. One slick was dark with globules of brown oil, but it was not iridescent. Patches of vegetable fiber and splinters of freshly broken wood were observed. At 1338hrs, PC-565 picked up a large piece of human flesh. The search was abandoned at 1430hrs.

At 0045hrs on 3 June,  conducted a box search in the vicinity of the sinking. Results were negative. Samples of oil were taken and after analysis, proved to be lubricating oil.

Operating on the theory that the U-boat was not sunk but was proceeding submerged and bleeding oil, Chickadee conducted a box search in the vicinity of the origin of the slick. The results were again negative. It was observed that the current was flowing in the direction of the wind. The conclusion was reached that the combined effect of wind and current caused the great length of the oil slick and that in fact, the U-boat had been sunk.

NOAA provides a record of the vessel at record 992 at chart 12200, indicating that the vessel is within 3–5 miles of the coordinates provided.

Wolfpacks
U-521 took part in three wolfpacks, namely:
 Kreuzotter (8 – 21 November 1942) 
 Rochen (27 January – 28 February 1943) 
 Tümmler (12 – 22 March 1943)

Summary of raiding history

See also
 Franz Machon

References

Bibliography

External links

World War II submarines of Germany
German Type IX submarines
1942 ships
U-boats commissioned in 1942
U-boats sunk in 1943
U-boats sunk by depth charges
U-boats sunk by US warships
Shipwrecks of the Virginia coast
Ships built in Hamburg
Maritime incidents in June 1943